The following lists events that happened in 2015 in South Korea.

Incumbents
 President: Park Geun-hye
 Prime Minister: 
 until 16 February: Chung Hong-won
 16 February-27 April: Lee Wan-koo 
 27 April-18 June: Choi Kyoung-hwan 
 starting 18 June: Hwang Kyo-ahn

Events

January 
 5 January - South Korea announces that it will repatriate the remains of Chinese People's Liberation Army soldiers killed in the Korean War.

February
 27 February - A shooting occurs in Hwaseong, Gyeonggi.

March 
 5 March - A knife-wielding assailant injures the American ambassador to South Korea, Mark W. Lippert, in the South Korean capital city of Seoul. Authorities report that the injuries on his face and wrist are not life-threatening.

May
 20 May - The beginning of the Middle East respiratory syndrome outbreak

June
 A drought occurs in South Korea and neighboring country North Korea.

July
 1 July - A bus accident in Ji'an, China results in the death of 10 Koreans and the Chinese bus driver.

September
 9 September - The Dolgorae sinks near Chuja Island.

Film

 List of 2015 box office number-one films in South Korea
 20th Busan International Film Festival
 2nd Wildflower Film Awards

Music

 List of number-one hits of 2015
 List of Gaon Album Chart number ones of 2015
 List of number-one streaming songs of 2015

Deaths
22 February - Kim Kyung-roul, South Korean billiards player (b. 1980)

See also
List of South Korean films of 2015
2015 in South Korean music
2015 in South Korean football
Years in South Korea

References 

 
South Korea
Years of the 21st century in South Korea
2010s in South Korea
South Korea